

The Fables by Christopher Smart were written  between 1750 and 1767 and partly published in the periodicals The Midwife; or The Old Woman's Magazine, The Gentleman's Magazine, The Literary Magazine, etc. The order in this collection of the fables was made by Smart himself and Christopher Hunter, Smart's biographer and nephew, after him, as it was printed posthumously in 1791 edition.

Contents

Quotations
 
— Karina Williamson, St. Hilda's College, Oxford, and University of Edinburgh

External links

 Poems of Smart, volume II, 1791
 Selected Poems by Christopher Smart
on "books.google.co.uk" (1)
 on "books.google.co.uk" (2)

Bibliography
 The Poetical Works of Christopher Smart: Volume IV: Miscellaneous Poems, English and Latin Edited by Karina Williamson Oxford University Press, USA (May 21, 1987)  

Poetry by Christopher Smart
Fables
Works originally published in British magazines